is a Japanese  cyclist. He won the Silver Medal in the Men's team sprint in the 2004 Summer Olympics along with Masaki Inoue and Tomohiro Nagatsuka. In Japan, he is mostly known as a keirin cyclist, with over 400 victories.

References 

1976 births
Living people
Cyclists at the 2004 Summer Olympics
Olympic cyclists of Japan
Olympic silver medalists for Japan
Japanese male cyclists
Medalists at the 2004 Summer Olympics
Keirin cyclists
Olympic medalists in cycling
21st-century Japanese people